Bonah Aliyari (also Romanized as Bonah ʿAlīyārī) is a village in Vahdat Rural District, Mugarmun District, Landeh County, Kohgiluyeh and Boyer-Ahmad Province, Iran. At the 2006 census, its population was 233, in 46 families.

References 

Populated places in Landeh County